Draginja Vuksanović-Stanković (Cyrillic: Драгиња Вуксановић-Станковић; born 7 April 1978) is a Montenegrin jurist, politician and professor of law at the University of Montenegro. She is the current member of Parliament and the former president of the Social Democratic Party. At the 2018 presidential election, she became the first female presidential candidate in the history of the country.

Biography
Vuksanović graduated from the Faculty of Law at the University of Montenegro in 2000, earning the master's degree in 2005, and the doctoral degree in 2011 at the same university. She works as a professor at the Faculty of Law and Faculty of Dramatic Arts of the University of Montenegro. She speaks French and English, while also using Italian and Spanish languages. 

According to Vuksanović, her mother is a Serb from Požega, Serbia.

Political career
Draginja Vuksanović is a member of the Social Democratic Party of Montenegro (SDP), and a member of the Parliament of Montenegro since 2012. In March 2018, Vuksanović announced her candidacy for the upcoming presidential election. She was nominated by the Social Democratic Party and supported by DEMOS, as the first female presidential candidate in the history of Montenegro. Vuksanović came third in the election, winning 8.2% of the votes.

On 29 June 2019, Vuksanović was elected president of the Social Democratic Party, making her the only female president of a Montenegrin political party, at the time. Vuksanović resigned after the poor results at the 2020 parliamentary election.

See also
 Social Democratic Party of Montenegro
 2018 Montenegrin presidential election

References

Living people
Members of the Parliament of Montenegro
People from Bar, Montenegro
1978 births
Montenegrin women in politics
Social Democratic Party of Montenegro politicians
Academic staff of the University of Montenegro
Montenegrin people of Serbian descent